Parosmodes is a genus of skippers in the family Hesperiidae.

Species
Parosmodes lentiginosa (Holland, 1896)
Parosmodes morantii (Trimen, 1873)
Parosmodes onza Evans, 1955

References

External links
Natural History Museum Lepidoptera genus database
 Seitz, A. Die Gross-Schmetterlinge der Erde 13: Die Afrikanischen Tagfalter. Plate XIII 78

Erionotini
Hesperiidae genera